Jamal Amer is a journalist from Yemen.  He is the editor of the weekly journal Al-Wasat, which he founded in 2004.  Al-Wasat frequently publishes reports critical of the government from international human rights organizations.

Background 
Prior to 2004, Amer worked as a journalist for the weekly Al-Wahdawi. His reporting resulted in convictions for "harming the public interest", "offending King Fahd of Saudi Arabia", and "damaging relations between Saudi Arabia and Yemen". In 2000, he was banned by a court from working as a journalist for having "insulted Saudi Arabia".

Abduction 
In 2005, Al-Wasat carried a series of articles criticizing government corruption, including an article on government officials who had sent children to allied countries to study despite a prohibition from President Ali Abdallah Saleh forbidding the arrangement. On 25 August, Amer was abducted outside his home in Sana'a by four men in a vehicle with military license plates. They blindfolded him, drove him into the mountains, beat him, threatened to kill him, and ordered him to stop writing about government officials before releasing him. Though Amer filed a complaint, authorities reportedly took no action on the case.

Along with burglaries at the offices of the Associated Press and another newspaper, the incident led to the founding of "a coalition of civil society advocacy of rights and freedoms" led by Yemeni journalists to advocate for their protection and rights. Internationally, the incident was condemned by the Austria-based International Press Institute, which called it "a disturbing picture of the varied methods being used to silence critical voices in the Yemeni press", and by the France-based Reporters Without Borders, which called it "a reminder that it is still very difficult to work as an independent journalist in this country". Amnesty International also issued a statement of concern. The following year, the US-based Committee to Protect Journalists awarded Amer its International Press Freedom Award, which recognizes journalists who show courage in defending press freedom despite facing attacks, threats, or imprisonment.

Later work 
Amer continued to edit Al-Wasat. In 2008, the Information Ministry attempted to revoke the paper's license, stating that Al-Wasat "undermined national unity, stirred up religious divisions and damaged relations with neighbouring countries". A court overturned the order, allowing the paper to continue publication.

In 2010, his reporter Anisa Mohammed Ali Othman was sentenced in absentia to a year's imprisonment on a charge of insulting the president after she wrote two articles about political corruption. Amer was fined 10,000 riyals (US$50). He described Othman's prison sentence as "cruel and illegal".

References

Yemeni journalists
Living people
Year of birth missing (living people)